"Come & Go" is a song by American rapper and singer Juice Wrld and American DJ and producer Marshmello. It was released on July 9, 2020, as the fourth single from Juice Wrld's posthumous third studio album, Legends Never Die. It debuted at number two on the Billboard Hot 100, matching "Lucid Dreams" as his highest-charting song. It is also the second song by Marshmello to chart in the top 10 of the Hot 100, matching "Happier" (with Bastille) as his highest-charting song.

Background
A rough demo of the song was teased by Juice in 2018. The track then leaked with the numerous demos for tracks in January 2020 along with "Righteous" and "Tell Me U Luv Me".

Shortly before release of the song, Marshmello took to Twitter to talk about his relationship with Higgins, saying that the rapper was "one of the most talented people I have ever met" and how they were both "constantly on the same page when it came to music".

Critical reception
Jon Blistein of Rolling Stone concluded that the "track finds Juice Wrld striving to be a better man over an atmospheric guitar loop that's soon pushed toward the edge by thumping drums", while sonically, Juice Wrld blends "his pop-punk inflected hip hop with Marshmello's big tent EDM". According to Aleia Woods of XXL, the song "has a punk-rock and EDM feel with heavy guitar strums". The Faders Jordan Darville felt that the song "is an attempt to make good on Juice WRLD's promise of global pop stardom, tragically unfulfilled by his death at age 21 of an accidental drug overdose". Lyrically, Jon Powell of Revolt thought the song saw "the late rapper speaking on his insecurities to his significant other" with lines like "I try to be everything that I can, but sometimes, I come out as bein' nothin".

Credits and personnel
Credits adapted from Tidal.
 Jarad Higgins – vocalist, song, composition
 Marshmello – song, compositions, producer
 Chris Galland – mixing  assistant 
 Jeremie Inhaber – mixing  assistant 
 Robin Florent – mix  assistant 
 Max Lord – engineer
 Tatsuya Sato – mastered  engineering
 Manny Marroquin – mixing

Charts

Weekly charts

Year-end charts

Certifications

References

2020 singles
2020 songs
Juice Wrld songs
Marshmello songs
Songs written by Juice Wrld
Songs written by Marshmello
Songs released posthumously
Interscope Records singles
Geffen Records singles
Animated music videos
American pop punk songs